Flame tree may refer to:

Common name of trees
 Alloxylon flammeum, commonly known as the Queensland tree waratah or red silky oak
 Brachychiton acerifolius, Illawarra flame tree
 Butea monosperma, Flame in the woods
 Delonix regia, Royal poinciana
 Embothrium coccineum, Chilean flame tree, also known as Chilean firebush
 Erythrina abyssinica, flame tree of eastern and southern Africa
 Erythrina sp., Coral tree
 Koelreuteria bipinnata, Chinese flame tree
 Nuytsia floribunda, Australian Christmas tree
 Peltophorum, African flame tree
 Spathodea campanulata, African tulip tree, also known as African flame tree

Other uses
 Flame Tree Publishing, a British publisher
 "Flame Trees" (song), by Cold Chisel

See also
 Flame (disambiguation)
 Flame of the forest, a list of similarly named plants
 The Flame Trees of Thika, a 1981 British television serial